Elisabeth West FitzHugh (July 30, 1926 – January 13, 2017) was a Lebanese American conservation scientist. She was a fellow of the American Institute for Conservation and the International Institute for Conservation.

Early life and education 
Elisabeth West FitzHugh was born on July 30, 1926, in Beirut. She was an undergraduate student in chemistry at Vassar College. After earning her bachelor's degree, she moved to the UCL Institute of Archaeology (then University of London), where she earned a master's degree in the Archaeology of Western Asia. During her studies she worked as an assistant curator and librarian at the American University of Beirut. She visited the Oriental Institute on an archaeological expedition in October 1950. On returning to the United States, FitzHugh met with George M. A. Hanfmann, then curator of the Fogg Art Museum, to discuss her career. He recommended she speak to Rutherford John Gettens at the Smithsonian Institution.

Career 
FitzHugh was appointed to the technical research team at the Freer Gallery of Art in 1956. She worked alongside Gettens to establish a technical scientific laboratory at the art gallery, creating the protocols for the analysis of materials and pigments. Specifically, she developed the laboratory procedures to better understand the Chinese bronzes. This involved wet chemistry approaches and emission spectroscopy. FitzHugh had access to primitative characterization equipment at the Freer Gallery, including chemical, comparison and metallurgical microscopes. To perform X-ray diffraction measurements, she visited the National Museum of Natural History.

FitzHugh spent her entire career at the Freer Gallery, working as an analytical and conservation scientist. It is thought she was the first woman cultural heritage scientist at the Smithsonian. She soon became an expert in Chinese Jade and bronze, Japanese painting and oriental lacquer. Amongst the many artists' pigments studied by FitzHugh, her work on the chemistry of Han purple and Han blue were groundbreaking.

FitzHugh was interested in the conservation and protection of art. She served as editor of International Institute for Conservation of Historic and Artistic Works (IIC) Abstracts, a journal summarizing the abstracts of books, conference proceedings and dissertations on art, archaeology and architecture. She held various roles in the American Institute for Conservation of Historic and Artistic Works, including Chair of Ethics and Standards and eventually President.

Awards and honors 
 1990 American Institute for Conservation R. J. Gettens Award
 1992 Honorary member of the American Institute for Conservation
 2002 International Institute for Conservation of Historic and Artistic Works Forbes Prize
 2016 Honorary fellow of the International Institute for Conservation

Legacy 
FitzHugh retired in 1991, but continued to work at the Smithsonian until 2011. She died in 2017 in Mitchellville.

Selected publications

References 

1926 births
2017 deaths
People from Beirut
Vassar College alumni
Alumni of the UCL Institute of Archaeology